Two human polls made up the 2008–09 NCAA Division I men's ice hockey rankings, the USCHO.com/CBS College Sports poll and the USA Today/USA Hockey Magazine poll. As the 2008–09 season progressed, rankings were updated weekly.

Legend

USA Today/USA Hockey Magazine

USCHO.com/CBS College Sports

References

External links
USA Today/USA Hockey Magazine Men's College Hockey Poll
USCHO.com/CBS College Sports Division I Men's Poll

Rankings
College men's ice hockey rankings in the United States